Merrifieldia improvisa is a moth of the family Pterophoridae that is known from Kenya.

References

improvisa
Moths described in 2001
Endemic moths of Kenya
Moths of Africa